HMS Mecklenburgh was a 6-gun single-masted cutter of the Royal Navy, purchased in 1763 during the last days of the Seven Years' War with France and assigned to coastal patrol offshore from Sussex. After ten years' service she was partly dismantled and sunk to form part of a breakwater in the port of Sheerness.

Construction 
Mecklenburgh was one of thirty cutters purchased by the Royal Navy in a three-month period from December 1762 to February 1763, for coastal duties off English ports. The function of these purchased cutters included convoy and patrol, the carrying of messages between Naval vessels in port and assisting the press gang in the interception of merchant craft.

Admiralty Orders for her purchase were issued on 29 December 1762, and the transaction was completed on 4 February 1763 at a cost of £400. She was a small craft, single-masted and with an overall length of  including bowsprit, a  keel, and measuring 82  tons burthen. Admiralty records indicate she was French-built and had been at sea as a merchant vessel since 1758.

On 12 February 1763 the newly purchased cutter was sailed to Sheerness Dockyard for fitting out as a Navy craft. Works ran for four months until 26 June, at a total cost of £994. Her merchant armament of eight three-pounder cannons was reduced to six, supported by ten -pounder swivel guns for anti-personnel use.

As rebuilt for Navy service, Mecklenburgh had a complement of 30 crew.

Naval service
War with France ended on 10 February 1763, after Mecklenburghs purchase but before completion of her fitout or assembling of her crew. Despite this, commissioning went ahead in April 1763 and the vessel entered the Navy as a patrol cutter off the Sussex coast. In 1766 command passed to Lieutenant Thomas Parke, and in 1769 to Lieutenant William Hills.

Mecklenburgh was declared surplus to navy requirements in 1773 and was sailed to Sheerness Dockyard for partial dismantling. The stripped-down hull of the vessel was then towed into the harbour and sunk as part of a breakwater.

Notes

References

Bibliography
 
 

Cutters of the Royal Navy
1758 ships
Ships sunk as breakwaters
Maritime incidents in 1773